The 2013 Clemson Tigers women's soccer team represented Clemson University during the 2013 NCAA Division I women's soccer season.  The Tigers were led by head coach Ed Radwanski, in his third season.  They played home games at Riggs Field.

Roster

Updated May 22, 2018

Schedule

|-
!colspan=6 style=""| Exhibition

|-
!colspan=6 style=""| Regular season

References

External links
 Official website

Clemson
Clemson Tigers women's soccer seasons
Clemson women's soccer